It's Effin' Science was an American television show on G4. It was hosted by Angie Greenup, Marc Horowitz and Chad Zdenek and produced by Renegade Productions.  Filming was based in Los Angeles, California and 10 episodes were ordered for the first season. The series premiered on June 15, 2010.

About
The series was a spin-off from a segment from another G4 series, Attack of the Show!. The series explored the weird, wild and off-beat side of science. The show featured the hosts creating and demonstrating experiments that the everyday person could attempt themselves. Experiments can be over-the-top, like turning a pool party into a massive game of Battleship, or simple combinations of everyday objects and science basics that can help the viewer win bar bets you can't lose or build gadgets like homemade night vision goggles. The series' tagline stated: "A full-on hack of science".

Background
Before filming started, the crew met for the first time in February 2010, at a Six Flags park. "They kind of forced us to bond because they didn't want us to meet for the first time in front of the cameras", said Horowitz. "So we pretended it was Angie's birthday, without telling her of course." The staff of the theme park serenaded a confused Greenup with "Happy Birthday".

G4 knew Greenup from Renegade Productions, Horowitz from previous auditions, and Zdenek as the engineer and "destruction consultant" from Human Wrecking Balls.

Hosts
Angie Greenup: The Host
Marc Horowitz: The Guinea Pig
Chad Zdenek: The Science Guy

Episode guide

Season 1

References

2010s American reality television series
2010 American television series debuts
G4 (American TV network) original programming
2010 American television series endings
English-language television shows